(+)-α-Terpineol synthase (EC 4.2.3.112) is an enzyme with systematic name geranyl-diphosphate diphosphate-lyase [cyclizing, (+)-α-terpineol-forming]. This enzyme catalyses the following chemical reaction

 geranyl diphosphate + H2O  (+)-α-terpineol + diphosphate

The enzyme has been characterized from Santalum album (sandalwood).

References

External links 
 

EC 4.2.3